Charles Henry Pletsch (December 31, 1893 – July 24, 1950) was a Canadian hockey player who played one game in the National Hockey League for the Hamilton Tigers during the 1920–21 season. He was born in Chesley, Ontario.

Career statistics

Regular season and playoffs

See also
 List of players who played only one game in the NHL

External links

1890s births
1950 deaths
Canadian ice hockey defencemen
Hamilton Tigers (ice hockey) players
Ice hockey people from Ontario
People from Bruce County